Miranda Bergman is a contemporary muralist and one of the seven women artists who in 1994 created the MaestraPeace mural, the largest mural in San Francisco, which covers The Women's Building.

Work 
She grew up in the San Francisco Mission District and attended Balboa High School. She now lives in Oakland.

In the 1970s, she joined other artists in the Haight-Ashbury Muralists. From 1972 to 1976 Bergman created labor-themed posters with Jane Nordling for the Working Peoples' Artists collective. She worked on a CETA-funded project with other artists to paint murals in the city jail.

In 1986, Bergman worked with Juana Alicia, Hector Noel Méndez, Ariella Seidenberg, and Arch Williams to create the mural El Amancer (The Dawn) in a park in Managua, Nicaragua. Bergman and Alicia completed part of the work in the middle of the night, guarded by armed teenagers and "working in spite of the threat of a U.S.-backed Contra attack."

Her South Africa-themed photo collage was included in the Syracuse Cultural Workers' 1987 calendar.

She worked and lived in the Palestinian city of Ramallah for nine weeks in 1989 with three other Jewish-American women artists and teachers as part of the Break the Silence mural project. The mural they created together is in the Popular Arts Center in Ramallah, Palestine. Bergman's poster Tribute to Palestinian Women was included in the 1989-1990 traveling exhibition In Celebration of the State of Palestine and is now part of the digital collection of The Palestine Poster Project Archives.

In 1984 she co-created "The Culture Contains the Seed of Resistance That Blossoms into the Flower of Liberation" with O’Brien Thiele, the last intact mural among the famed Placa murals of Balmy Alley in San Francisco. This mural depicts a naturally beautiful landscape contrasted against women holding photographs of desaparecidos.

Bergman has also worked on other murals in the San Francisco Bay Area. In the 1990s, Bergman was also a consulting editor of Frontiers: A Journal of Women Studies.

Bergman participated in the May, 2017 San Francisco SOMArts Cultural Center's exhibition, "Shifting Movements: Art Inspired by the Life and Activism of Yuri Kochiyama (1921-2014)."

Publications 
 Community Murals An International Visual Arts Magazine, Volume 12, No. 1 (Spring 1987)
 Maestrapeace Art Works (2000)

References

1940s births
Living people
American artist groups and collectives
Artists from California
Mission District, San Francisco
Art in the San Francisco Bay Area